McHenry Community High School District 156 is a public school district that serves parts of McHenry County, Illinois. This includes the communities of McHenry, Bull Valley, Wonder Lake, Lakemoor, and McCullom Lake.

Schools
The McHenry Community High School District 156 operates two different campuses that serves students in different parts of McHenry County. The main campus is McHenry High School - Upper Campus, which only serves students between 10th grade and 12th grade. The Freshman Campus only serves students in 9th grade.
McHenry West High School
McHenry East High School

References

External links
McHenry Community High School District 156

School districts in Illinois
School districts in McHenry County, Illinois
McHenry, Illinois